State Highway 73 (SH 73) is a Texas state highway that runs  from Winnie through Port Arthur to near Orange.

In September 2008, Hurricane Ike forced the closure of SH 73. Among other road debris left by the storm were two 200-ton barges. The storm surge pushed the barges inland before they came to rest on the highway.

History

Previous routes

The original SH 73 was designated on August 21, 1923, from Oldenburg to Houston, absorbing the eastern half of SH 3A. On October 26, 1932, it was rerouted southwest from Katy to Alleyton, with the portion from Oldenburg to Industry being another section (FM 109 would connect the two sections later). On November 30, 1932, the section from Katy to Sealy was taken over for maintenance, and plans to construct the section from Sealy to Alleyton were underway. On December 8, 1932, the section from Industry to Oldenburg was transferred to SH 159. On July 15, 1935, the section from Sealy to Alleyton was cancelled. This section was restored on May 19, 1936. On September 26, 1939, SH 73 was extended east to Port Arthur, replacing SH 228, and the stretch from Winnie to Anahuac replaced part of SH 125. On November 24, 1941, the section from Columbus to Houston was canceled and transferred to rerouted US 90. Construction was slow, with only small portions outside Houston, Port Arthur, and the stretch from Winnie to Anahuac (signed as 73-T) completed by 1954. On November 30, 1961, the route was shortened from Port Arthur to Winnie, with the western portions having been replaced by Interstate 10 (I-10). SH 73-T was renumbered as SH 65. On July 29, 1982, the route was extended along its current route to Orange, along a concurrent route with SH 87 and SH 62.

SH 73A was designated on July 18, 1924, from SH 73 in Fayetteville to Hempstead as a restoration of canceled SH 3C. On March 19, 1930, this route was renumbered SH 159.

In popular culture
SH 73 in Texas is shown as a road sign in the opening 10 seconds of the 1941 movie Moon Over Miami immediately following the opening credits. There is no mention of the city in that film. A similar road sign of SH 73 is also depicted on the set of The Partridge Family.

Major intersections

See also

References

External links

073
Transportation in Chambers County, Texas
Transportation in Jefferson County, Texas
Transportation in Orange County, Texas
Interstate 10